Tamil Nadu Industrial Explosives Limited (TEL) is a state-government undertaking of Government of Tamil Nadu located in the Indian state of Tamil Nadu. It is Industrial Explosives manufacturer.

The Industrial Explosives project is located in the Panamadangi Reserve Forest, Vandaranthangal / Dharapadavedu Villages, Katpadi, Vellore-59.
Tamil Nadu Industrial Explosives Limited (TEL) Board is headed by a senior IAS officer.

The manufacturing facilities are house in 700 acres of Forest Land which is 7 km north of Katpadi Railway Station on the Vellore-Chittoor Highway.

TEL Products
 Detators
 Detonating Fuse
 Emulsion Explosives
 Slurry Explosives
 MMAN Based Explosives
 2EHN

Major Clients 
 Coal India and its subsidiaries (CIL)
 Singareni Collieries Co. Limited    (SCCL)
 Neyveli Lignite Corporation Limited   (NLC)
 Director General of Border Roads    (DGBR)
 Electricity Boards (Hydro Electric Projects)
 Irrigation Projects
 Mineral Development Corporations.
 Railway Tunneling
 Oil and Natural Gas Commission (ONGC)
 State Public Works Departments.
 Cement Factories.
 Water Source Development and Quarrying

Heads 
 Mr. Chandrasekhar
 Mr. R P Sinha
 Mr. Sikandar Basha
 Mr. Murugan

References

External links 
 
 Tamil Nadu Industrial Explosives Limited

Chemical companies of India
Explosives manufacturers
Chemical companies established in 1983
Government-owned companies of India
Companies based in Chennai
1983 establishments in Tamil Nadu
Indian companies established in 1983